Suad Šehović (born 19 February 1987) is a Montenegrin professional basketball player for Budućnost VOLI of the ABA League and the Montenegrin League. He is the older brother of professional basketball player Sead Šehović.

He averaged 5.4 points and 2.7 rebounds per game during the 2019–20 season. On 9 June 2020 he re-signed with Budućnost.

References

External links
 Suad Šehović at aba-liga.com
 Suad Šehović at euroleague.net

1987 births
Living people
BC Budivelnyk players
BC Khimik players
Bosniaks of Montenegro
KK Bosna Royal players
KK Budućnost players
KK Olimpija players
Montenegrin expatriate sportspeople in Bosnia and Herzegovina
Montenegrin expatriate sportspeople in Slovenia
Montenegrin expatriate sportspeople in Ukraine
Montenegrin men's basketball players
People from Bijelo Polje
Shooting guards
Small forwards
2019 FIBA Basketball World Cup players